The Sweeney Mountains is a group of mountains of moderate height and about  extent, located  north of the Hauberg Mountains in Palmer Land, Antarctica.

Discovered by the Ronne Antarctic Research Expedition (RARE), 1947–48, under Finn Ronne, who named these mountains after Commander Edward C. Sweeney, a contributor to the expedition.


List of mountains 
 Mount Edward –  A prominent rock mountain located centrally along the southern margin of the range. It was discovered by RARE, who named this summit for Commander Edward C. Sweeney, USNR, a contributor to the expedition.
 Hagerty Peak A peak in the southeast extremity of the range. Mapped by United States Geological Survey (USGS) from ground surveys and U.S. Navy air photos, 1961–67. Named by Advisory Committee on Antarctic Names (US-ACAN) for Cornelius J. Hagerty, photographer with the McMurdo Station winter party in 1960.

See also
Potter Peak

References

Mountain ranges of Palmer Land